Moor Park Methodist Church is a former Methodist church in Garstang Road, Preston, Lancashire, England.  It is recorded in the National Heritage List for England as a designated Grade X listed building.

History

The church was built in 1861–62, and designed by Poulton and Woodman.  It was opened on 26 June 1862, and could seat about 900 people.  The church closed in 1984.

Architecture

The church is built in brick on a stone plinth, with sandstone dressings and a slate roof, and is in simplified Italianate style.  It has a rectangular plan, and contains aisles.  On the entrance front is a semicircular portico carried on square columns with Composite capitals.  Between these are round-headed arches with keystones.  At the top of the portico is a frieze and a dentilled cornice.  Inside the portico are double doorways and tall windows.  The portico is flanked by bays, each containing a tall narrow round-headed arch with two windows, the lower one flat-headed and the upper one round-headed.  Above the portico is a pediment with three windows forming an arcade, over which is an oculus.  Along the sides of the church are six bays, each with paired arches separated by mullions, and each containing windows similar to those flanking the portico.  Inside the church is a horseshoe gallery carried on octagonal cast iron columns.

See also

Listed buildings in Preston, Lancashire

Notes and references
Notes

Citations

Grade II listed churches in Lancashire
Methodist churches in Lancashire
Churches completed in 1862
Churches in Preston
Former churches in Lancashire
Former Methodist churches in the United Kingdom
1862 establishments in England